Olga Vladimirovna Medynich (born 16 December 1981) is a Russian theater and film actress.

Biography
Olga Medynich was born in Leningrad, Russian SFSR, Soviet Union  (now Saint Petersburg, Russia). Olga Medynich graduated from the Saint Petersburg State Theatre Arts Academy in  Actress Puppet Theater, the course Nikolai Naumov. She performed in the student plays  Biography  by Max Frisch and  Winter's Tale  by William Shakespeare, where she performed the role of Hermione, Pauline, Loss and Time.

In 2003, for the execution of clownery performance  Hanger, the actress was awarded the diploma  The Muse of St. Petersburg, and a year later won the 2nd prize at the Moscow Variety Contest named after Brunow. After the  Winter's Tale  Semyon Spivak invited her into the company of the Youth Theatre on the Fontanka, where in 2004 she made her debut in the play  Story of Kai and Gerda.

She has been a member of the cast of the Russian sketch shows Women's League and Big Difference. Medynich has also acted in several movies and TV shows.

Filmography
Big Difference (2008-2014, TV)
All Inclusive (2011)
Catherine the Great (2015, TV)

References

External links 
 
 Biography 

1981 births
Living people
Actresses from Saint Petersburg
Russian film actresses
Russian television actresses
Russian stage actresses
21st-century Russian actresses
Russian State Institute of Performing Arts alumni
Russian women comedians